Lanark was a federal electoral district represented in the House of Commons of Canada  from 1917 to 1968. It was located in the province of Ontario. This riding was first created in 1914 from Lanark North and Lanark South ridings.

It consisted of the county of Lanark.

The electoral district was abolished in 1966 when it was redistributed between Frontenac—Lennox and Addington and Lanark and Renfrew ridings.

Members of Parliament

This riding elected the following members of the House of Commons of Canada:

Electoral history

|}

On Mr. Hanna's death, 27 February 1918:

|}

|}

On Mr. Stewart's death, 7 October 1922:
 

|}

|}

On Mr. Preston's death, 8 February 1929:
 

|}

|}

|}

|}

|}

|}

|}

|}

On Mr. Blair's death, 16 June 1957:
 

|}

|}

|}

|}

|}

See also 

 List of Canadian federal electoral districts
 Past Canadian electoral districts

External links 
Parliamentary website

Former federal electoral districts of Ontario